Tragic Tales of Love and Life is a collection of recordings cut between 1946 and 1955 by Cowboy Copas.

Track listing

Track information and credits taken from the album's liner notes.

References

1960 compilation albums
King Records (United States) albums